Auclair is a French surname. Notable people with the surname include:

 Jean Auclair (born 1946), member of the National Assembly of France
 Josée Auclair (born 1962), Canadian explorer
 JP Auclair (1977–2014), Canadian freestyle skier
 Marcelle Auclair (1899–1983), French novelist, biographer, and journalist
 Michel Auclair (1922–1988), French actor
 Michèle Auclair (1924–2005), French violinist
 Vincent Auclair (born 1965), Canadian politician

See also
Auclair, Quebec, a municipality in Canada
Hubertine Auclert (1848–1914), a French suffragist

French-language surnames